Lechia Lwów (full name: Lwowski Klub Sportowy "Lechia" Lwów) was the first Polish professional association football club, founded in summer 1903 in Lwów by students of the 3rd and 4th gymnasiums as well as former members of the Sokół football department.

During the Second Republic of Poland the club was one of four teams from Lwów that played in the Polish Football First league (season 1931 – 12th). The club became two times champion of Lwów District League (liga okręgowa) where it spent 17 seasons. After invasion of Poland by the Soviet forces in 1939 the club was dissolved and its place was formed FC Lokomotyv Lviv. The club's name comes from Lechia, the original name for Poland.

The club's tradition as a Polish club was continued by people expelled from Lwów who moved to Gdańsk and created Lechia Gdańsk after war in 1945 such as Ryszard Koncewicz.

General information
 Full name: Lwowski Klub Sportowy (Lwów's Sports Club) "Lechia" Lwów
 Founded: 1903 in Lwów
 Hues: White-Green
 Sections: football, ice-hockey, boxing
 Stadium: Sokół Stadium (today Skif Stadium) and Stadium of the 40th Rifle Regiment (in National League)

Honours
 Promotional play-offs to the National League
 Winners (1): 1930
 Runners-up (1): 1929
 Lwów District League
 Winners (2): 1929, 1930
 Runners-up (2): 1927, 1933
 Ekstraklasa (National League)
 Participant (1): 1931

Retro league
In 2019, the Lechia Lwów team had been reconstructed by the historical reconstruction association in Poland as part of the Retro Liga project. The players play in carefully recreated costumes and shoes according to the rules of 1938. The teams chosen for the Retro Liga were those forced to disband in 1939 after the outbreak of World War II. The other teams who took part were WKS Kutno, WKS Łowicz, WKS Grodno (Grodno were not reformed as the borders after WWII meant they were now in Belorussian territory), and Śmigły Wilno (Śmigły were not reformed as the borders after WWII meant they were now in Lithuanian territory).

Lechia Lwów were crowned the inaugural winners of the Retro Liga for the 2019 season.

See also
 History of football in Poland
 Czarni Lwów
 Pogoń Lwów
 Sparta Lwów
 Hasmonea Lwów
 Lechia Gdańsk
 Sports in Poland

References

Association football clubs established in 1903
Association football clubs disestablished in 1939
Lwów District Football League
Polish football clubs in Lviv
1903 establishments in Poland
1939 disestablishments in Poland
1903 establishments in Austria-Hungary
Defunct football clubs in former Polish territories